Bela De Nagy (July 13, 1893 – August 27, 1945) was an American fencer. He competed in the team sabre event at the 1936 Summer Olympics.

References

External links
 

1893 births
1945 deaths
American male sabre fencers
Olympic fencers of the United States
Fencers at the 1936 Summer Olympics
Austro-Hungarian military personnel of World War I